is a train station in Kitagata Town, Takeo, Saga Prefecture, Japan. It is operated by JR Kyushu and is on the Sasebo Line.

Lines
Only Sasebo Line local services stop at this station.

Station layout 
The station, which is unstaffed, consists of a side and an island platform serving three tracks. Sidings branch off tracks 1 and 3. The station building is a timber structure which presently serves only as a waiting room. Access to the island platform is by means of a footbridge.

Adjacent stations

History
In the next phase of expansion, the track was extended westwards with Takeo (today ) opening as the new western terminus on 5 May 1895. Kitagata was opened on the same day as an intermediate station along the new stretch of track. When the Kyushu Railway was nationalized on 1 July 1907, Japanese Government Railways (JGR) took over control of the station. On 12 October 1909, the station became part of the Nagasaki Main Line. On 1 December 1934, another track was designated the Nagasaki Main Line and the track serving the station was redesignated the Sasebo Line. With the privatization of Japanese National Railways (JNR), the successor of JGR, on 1 April 1987, control of the station passed to JR Kyushu.

Passenger statistics
In fiscal 2015, there were a total of 36,647 boarding passengers, giving a daily average of 100 passengers.

Environs
National Route 34
Rokkaku River

See also
 List of railway stations in Japan

References

External links
Kitagata Station (JR Kyushu)

Sasebo Line
Railway stations in Saga Prefecture
Railway stations in Japan opened in 1895